How Far to Asgaard is the first full-length album by the Faroese heavy metal band Týr. It was released in January 2002 by Tutl Records.

"Ormurin Langi" is a metal version of the traditional Faroese song. A video for the song was also recorded in Iceland.

The song "How Far to Asgaard" is 8:59 in length, followed by 9:50 of silence. At 18:49 there is the Faroese poem "Nornagest Ríma" chanted by a group and accompanied by rhythmic stamping.

The Russian release of the album is issued by СД-Максимум (CD-Maximum) under license from Tutl Records. The 9:50 of silence on the track "How Far to Asgaard" is shortened to just 0:51. This version also contains the video for "Hail to the Hammer". The album art on this version is an obvious remake of the original.

The album was re-released on 2 October 2008 by Napalm Records with a new cover artwork and two additional tracks originally from the single "Ólavur Riddararós" released in 2002. In the re-released version, the poem "Nornagest Ríma" is used as a bonus track after the song "Stýrisvølurin", instead of "How Far to Asgaard". "Stýrisvølurin" ends at 6:42 and is followed by 2:52 seconds of silence, until "Nornagest Ríma" starts at 9:34.

Track listing
Music by Týr except where noted. Lyrics by Heri Joensen except where noted.

Personnel

 Pól Arni Holm – vocals
 Heri Joensen – guitars, backing vocals
 Gunnar H. Thomsen – bass, backing vocals
 Kári Streymoy – drums, percussion, backing vocals
 Allan Streymoy – lead vocals on tracks 9–10
Production
 Mastered by Lenhert Kjeldsen
 Mixed by Lasse Glavind and Jesper Johansen

References

External links
How Far to Asgaard on Discogs

2002 albums
Týr (band) albums
Napalm Records albums